To the Eyes of Memory (French: Aux yeux du souvenir) is a 1948 French romantic drama film directed by Jean Delannoy and starring Michèle Morgan, Jean Marais and Jean Chevrier. Delannoy co-wrote screenplay with Henri Jeanson and Georges Neveux. It was shot at the Francoeur and Joinville Studios in Paris. The film's sets were designed by the art director René Renoux. The admissions in France were 4,559,689 people. It was nominated for a Golden Lion for Delannoy at 1949 Venice Film Festival.

Cast 
 Michèle Morgan as Claire Magny
 Jean Marais as Jacques Forester
 Jean Chevrier as Le commandant Pierre Aubry
 Robert Murzeau as Paul Marcadout
 René Simon as En personne / Himself
 Jacques Louvigny as Le passager
 Jim Gérald as Le major
 Jeannette Batti as Ketty
 Colette Mars as Marcelle Marinier
 Daniel Ivernel as Bordas, le radio 
 Philippe Lemaire as Un pilote 
 Germaine Michel as La logeuse
 Yette Lucas as Mme Bastide
 Moune de Rivel as La chanteuse du night-club
 Marfa d'Hervilly as Une passagère
 Albert Duvaleix as Un passager
 Nicole Courcel as	Une élève du cours Simon
 Robert Hossein as 	Un élève du cours Simon
 Philippe Nicaud as 	Un élève du cours Simon

References

Bibliography
 Daniel Biltereyst, Richard Maltby & Philippe Meers. Cinema, Audiences and Modernity: New Perspectives on European Cinema History. Routledge, 2013.

External links
 
 
 Aux yeux du souvenir at Alice Cinema
 
 [http://www.cinema-francais.fr/les_films/films_d/films_delannoy_jean/aux_yeux_du_souvenir.htm Aux yeux du souvenir] at LE CINEMA FRANCOPHONE

1948 films
Films directed by Jean Delannoy
French black-and-white films
Pathé films
French romantic drama films
1948 romantic drama films
1940s French-language films
Films shot at Francoeur Studios
Films shot at Joinville Studios
1940s French films